Prison Break is an American serial drama television series created by Paul Scheuring for Fox. The series revolves around two brothers, Lincoln Burrows (Dominic Purcell) and Michael Scofield (Wentworth Miller); Burrows has been sentenced to death for a crime he did not commit, while Scofield devises an elaborate plan to help his brother escape prison and clear his name. Along with creator Paul Scheuring, the series is executive-produced by Matt Olmstead, Kevin Hooks, Marty Adelstein, Dawn Parouse, Neal H. Moritz, and Brett Ratner who directed the pilot episode. The series' theme music, composed by Ramin Djawadi, was nominated for a Primetime Emmy Award in 2006. Prison Break is a joint production between Original Film, Adelstein/Parouse Productions (seasons 1–4), Dawn Olmstead Productions (season 5), Adelstein Productions (season 5), One Light Road Productions (season 5) and 20th Century Fox Television, and is syndicated by 20th Television.

The series was originally turned down by Fox in 2003, which was concerned about the long-term prospects of such a series. Following the popularity of serialized prime time television series Lost and 24, Fox decided to back production in 2004. The first season received mostly positive reviews from critics with universal acclaim from audiences. Furthermore, it performed exceptionally in the ratings and was originally planned for a 13-episode run, but was extended to include an extra nine episodes due to its popularity. The subsequent seasons continued to receive strong ratings, however, with some critics claiming the show had overstayed its welcome. Prison Break was nominated for several industry awards, including the 2005 Golden Globe Award for Best Television Series Drama and the 2006 People's Choice Award for Favorite New TV Drama, which it won. In the United States, all five seasons have been released on DVD and released on Blu-ray internationally.

The success of the series has spawned several official tie-ins: a video game, the spin-off series Prison Break: Proof of Innocence for mobile phones, online webisodes, an official magazine, and a novel. The fourth season of Prison Break returned from its mid-season break in a new timeslot on April 17, 2009, for the series' last six episodes. Two additional episodes, titled "The Old Ball and Chain" and "Free" were produced, and were later transformed into a standalone feature, titled The Final Break. Its events take place before the last scene of the series finale, and conclude the plotlines. The feature was released on DVD and Blu-ray July 21, 2009.

A nine-episode fifth season was announced by Fox in January 2016. The revival series premiered on April 4, 2017, and concluded on May 30. In January 2018, Fox confirmed that season 6 was in early development; however, in August 2019, Fox announced that it had no current plans to revive Prison Break, with Miller stating in late 2020 that he had no plan to return to the series.

Series overview

Season 1

The first season follows the rescue of Lincoln Burrows, who is accused of murdering Terrence Steadman, the brother of Vice President of the United States, Caroline Reynolds. Lincoln is sentenced to death and is incarcerated in Fox River State Penitentiary where he awaits his execution. Lincoln's brother, brilliant structural engineer Michael Scofield, is convinced of Lincoln's innocence and formulates an elaborate escape plan. In order to gain access to Fox River, Michael commits an armed robbery which results in him being sentenced to Fox River. In prison, Michael befriends the prison doctor Sara Tancredi when he pretends to suffer from Type 1 diabetes, in order to gain daily access to the prison's infirmary, where he receives his daily insulin shots. The brothers' fight to ward off the execution is aided by their lifelong friend Veronica Donovan, who begins to investigate the conspiracy that put Lincoln in jail. However, they are hindered by covert agents, members of an organization called "The ". The  was responsible for framing Lincoln, and they did so because of Lincoln's father Aldo Burrows, and his former connections with The . The brothers, along with six inmates, Fernando Sucre, Theodore "T-Bag" Bagwell, Benjamin Miles "C-Note" Franklin, David "Tweener" Apolskis, John Abruzzi, and Charles "Haywire" Patoshik, who come to be known as the Fox River Eight, escape in the season's penultimate episode by using their prison privileges to dig an escape tunnel underneath the prison.

Season 2

The second season begins eight hours after the escape, focusing mainly on the eight escapees. Series creator Paul Scheuring describes the second season as "The Fugitive times eight" and likens it to the "second half of The Great Escape." The fugitives split up and journey to locations across the country with the authorities close behind them as they each pursue their individual goals. Brad Bellick gets fired from the prison where he worked as the main guard and chases after the inmates himself for the reward money. Several of the escapees reunite in search of a large cache of money buried long ago by another Fox River inmate, Charles Westmoreland. Federal agent Alexander Mahone is assigned to track down and capture the eight fugitives, but is revealed to be working for The , which wants all eight men dead. When Sara discovers her father, Governor Frank Tancredi, has been killed, she meets with Michael, remaining with him as the brothers try to bring down now-President Reynolds, a  member. To ensure the brothers' safety, Sara allows herself to be arrested and faces trial. During the trial, the testimony of former Secret Service agent Paul Kellerman, who used to work for The -controlled President, exonerates Lincoln and Sara. Half of the escapees are killed or recaptured, but the brothers make it to Panama. Michael, T-Bag, Mahone, and Bellick are arrested by the Panamanian authorities and imprisoned at the Penitenciaría Federal de Sona.

Season 3

The third season follows Michael inside Sona and Lincoln on the outside in Panama. Sona is a prison run by the inmates and guarded only from the outside, due to a riot the year before. Inmates are only supplied with food and water and are expected to distribute and serve fellow inmates independently. The surrounding landscape is monitored by armed guards, who shoot at  the sight of inmates escaping. Burrows is quickly contacted by Gretchen Morgan (a 's operative who was in charge of operations in Panama) who kidnapped his son LJ and Sara, the woman Michael loves. He is told that The  wants Scofield to break James Whistler out of Sona. The season follows Michael and Whistler's trials in formulating an escape plan, as Michael has to deal with extreme tension and as Lincoln deals with The 's operative Gretchen Morgan. Sucre gets a job at the prison to aid Michael in his escape plan. When Lincoln attempts to rescue Sara and LJ following a clue provided by Sara, Gretchen claims to have beheaded Sara and sends Lincoln a head in a box as a warning. As the season ends, the pair manage to escape along with Mahone, and another inmate, Luis, leaving behind several accomplices including T-Bag and Bellick. Sucre's identity is discovered by a prison guard and he is thrown into Sona just after the escape. LJ and Sofia (who was captured for a guarantee that Whistler would go with her) are traded for Whistler, and Michael seeks revenge against Gretchen for Sara's death.

Season 4

The major storyline for the fourth season is about a team recruited by Homeland Security agent Don Self to obtain Scylla. Although the team initially believes it to be The 's "black book," it is later revealed to contain information on an advanced renewable power cell. Over the course of the first half of the season, the team obtains cards to access Scylla and breaks into The 's headquarters to steal it, Sara is discovered to be alive, Bellick dies when he sacrifices himself, and Self is revealed to be a double agent intent on selling Scylla to the highest bidder. Reluctantly, Lincoln decides to join The  to get it back, while Michael suffers from a hypothalamic hamartoma. He is treated and operated on by The . Michael later learns that his mother, Christina is still alive and was an agent of The , who is revealed to acquire Scylla to sell to the highest bidder. Eventually, the series' main storyline of the past 4 seasons ends in Miami, where Scylla is recovered by Michael and the team, the General and The  are taken down, and Sara kills Christina.

The last two episodes of the season represent the series finale.  In the penultimate episode, Sara is seen buying flowers in Panama with her toddler son, Michael, before visiting Michael's grave with Lincoln, Sucre and Mahone.  The final episode and television movie Prison Break: The Final Break show what happened between the takedown of The  and Michael's death.  This story involves the incarceration of Sara in Miami-Dade county penitentiary for Christina's murder. The General and T-Bag are in the adjacent men's facility.  The General wants Sara dead and has put a $100,000 bounty on her. Michael hears of the bounty and devises a plan to break Sara out. In the end, knowing that he is dying from a brain tumor, Michael sacrifices himself for Sara to escape.

Season 5
 

In June 2015, it was reported that a revival was in development at Fox. The limited series is a sequel to the original series, taking place several years later and features Wentworth Miller and Dominic Purcell reprising their roles as well as the return of series creator Paul Scheuring. Despite Michael being killed in the series finale, Fox CEO Dana Walden said that the series will provide "a logical and believable explanation to why the characters are alive and still moving around the world". In January 2016, Fox officially ordered the revival to series, with the episode order revised to nine episodes. In March 2016, it was confirmed that Sarah Wayne Callies, Amaury Nolasco, Robert Knepper, Rockmond Dunbar and Paul Adelstein would reprise their roles. Filming began in April 2016 in Vancouver, and several Moroccan cities including Rabat, Casablanca, and Ouarzazate. It debuted on April 4, 2017, and aired on Tuesdays at 9:00 pm.

Cast and characters

Prison Break maintains an ensemble cast for each season along with many recurring guest stars. The first season features a cast of ten actors who receive star billing, who were based in Chicago or at Fox River State Penitentiary. The second season features a cast of nine actors who receive billing; three characters are downgraded from series regular to recurring status, another is upgraded, and a new character is introduced. The third season introduces four new characters; two of whom are prisoners at Penitenciaría Federal de Sona.

Most of the changes in the cast have been due to character deaths. Series creator, Paul Scheuring, explains that killing off major characters "makes the audience that much more fearful for our protagonists" and that "it actually does help us in terms of reducing story lines". The two protagonists of the series, Michael Scofield and Lincoln Burrows, are the only characters to have appeared in every episode of the series.

 Dominic Purcell as Lincoln Burrows: Lincoln is a high school drop-out and a convicted felon, who is wrongfully convicted of the murder of Terence Steadman, the brother of the Vice President of the United States. Purcell was cast three days before the start of production and consequently, he was the last actor to join the original cast. He auditioned for the role while he had a recurring role as Tommy Ravetto on North Shore. Since working on John Doe, Purcell has had an amiable relationship with Fox. Hence, he was sent the pilot script of Prison Break. Scheuring's first impression of Purcell did not convince him as a fit for the role since the actor went to the audition with his hair styled and a tan. However, Purcell's acting won the role. He arrived on the set on the first day of filming with a shaved head, which amazed Scheuring with the physical likeness of the series' two leading actors.
 Wentworth Miller as Michael Scofield: Michael is Lincoln's brother (his last name is his mother's maiden name), and worked as a structural engineer before devoting full-time to his brother's case. In order to save his brother's life, Michael creates an elaborate plan to help his brother escape from prison. In an interview, Paul Scheuring recalled that most of the actors who tested for the role "would come in playing mysterious, but it was so cheesy and false." A week before the start of production, Miller auditioned for the role and impressed Scheuring with his performance; he was cast the following day.
 Amaury Nolasco as Fernando Sucre: Sucre develops a friendship with Michael during time at Fox River State Penitentiary, where he was his cell-mate. Initially, his character's story focuses on his wish to reunite with his fiancée. Upon receiving the pilot script, Nolasco's first thought was that it was "one of those failed pilots that the network did not really want" since most of the series' pilots would have started production by that time. Admitting that he does not like to read, Nolasco was amazed that the script was a "huge page-turner". Prior to his last audition for the role, Nolasco recalled his nervousness, which grew when Paul Scheuring told him that he was their favorite choice. Subsequently, he was cast in the role.
 Robert Knepper as Theodore "T-Bag" Bagwell: T-Bag appears in all five seasons of the series as a cunning, violent, and manipulative psychopath, consistently underestimated by those around him. T-Bag will stop at nothing to get what he wants and lets nothing stand in his way.
 Robin Tunney as Veronica Donovan (seasons 1–2): Veronica is Michael and Lincoln's childhood friend who decides to review Lincoln's case at Michael's insistence. She becomes Lincoln's lawyer and appears as a major character in the first season. She also stars in the first episode of the second season.
 Peter Stormare as John Abruzzi (seasons 1–2): Due to his role as the leader of a Chicago mafia, Abruzzi became a prominent figure at Fox River State Penitentiary. He agrees to provide an escape jet plane for Michael in exchange for the location of the eyewitness to his crimes, Otto Fibonacci. He appears regularly in the first half of the first season and makes selected appearances towards the end of the first season and the beginning of the second season.
 Marshall Allman as Lincoln "L. J." Burrows Jr. (seasons 1–4): L. J. is the teenage son of Lincoln Burrows and is greatly affected by his father's death sentence. He is forced into hiding after he becomes the target of the people who want Lincoln dead.
 Wade Williams as Brad Bellick (seasons 1–4): Bellick is introduced as the captain of Fox River's correctional officers. After reading the pilot script, Williams initially did not want to portray the role of Bellick because the character was "horrible and despicable". His reluctance stemmed from being the father of a four-year-old daughter. However, his manager persuaded him to audition and Williams landed the role.
 Sarah Wayne Callies as Sara Tancredi (seasons 1–2, 4–5): Sara is the prison doctor at Fox River and the daughter of Governor Frank Tancredi, who is linked into the plot that brings Lincoln to Fox River. She takes a liking to Michael and eventually aids his escape. She ultimately joins them on the run. Callies was the first actress the producers saw at the audition for the role of Sara Tancredi and was also the first to become a principal cast member.
 Paul Adelstein as Paul Kellerman (seasons 1–2, 4–5): Kellerman was introduced as a Secret Service agent working for the Vice President to make sure that the execution of Lincoln Burrows goes smoothly. He appears as a major character in the first and second seasons.
 Rockmond Dunbar as Benjamin Miles "C-Note" Franklin (seasons 1–2, 4–5): Desperate for his family, C-Note blackmails Michael at Fox River to join his escape team. He appears in the series as a major character in the first and second seasons.
 William Fichtner as Alexander Mahone (seasons 2–4): Introduced as an FBI agent in the second season, Mahone's assignment was to locate the fugitives. Mahone is intellectually matched with Michael and his background unfolds as the series progresses. In the third season he finds himself incarcerated with Michael in Sona and is eventually forced to become his ally through the fourth season.
 Chris Vance as James Whistler (seasons 3–4): Whistler is incarcerated in Sona for the murder of the Mayor's son and appears as a major character in the third season. He also stars in the first episode of the fourth season.
 Robert Wisdom as Norman "Lechero" St. John (season 3): Appearing as a major character in the third season, Lechero is a prisoner at Sona who rules the prison as a dictator and a Panamanian drug kingpin.
 Danay Garcia as Sofia Lugo (seasons 3–4): Sofia was introduced in the third season as Whistler's girlfriend. At the beginning of the fourth season, she begins dating Lincoln Burrows.
 Jodi Lyn O'Keefe as Gretchen Morgan (seasons 3–4): Introduced as "Susan B. Anthony", Gretchen is an operative for The  who is in charge of ensuring the escape of James Whistler.
 Michael Rapaport as Donald Self (season 4): Introduced in the fourth season, Self is a Department of Homeland Security special agent who teams up with the gang to take down The .
 Mark Feuerstein as Jacob Anton Ness (season 5): Introduced in the fifth season, Jacob is Sara's new husband and an economics professor who is later revealed to be a rogue CIA operative who is responsible for Michael's disappearance.
 Inbar Lavi as Sheba (season 5): The leader of a resistance against ISIL in Yemen, Sheba appears as C-Note's friend and Lincoln's love interest.
 Augustus Prew as David "Whip" Martin (season 5): Michael's cellmate and partner in the fifth season, as well as T-Bag's illegitimate son. He is the muscle to back up Michael, often called Michael's whip hand.

Production

Conception
The original concept of Prison Break—a man deliberately getting himself sent to prison in order to help someone escape—was suggested to Paul Scheuring by producer Dawn Parouse, who wanted to produce an action-oriented series. Although Scheuring thought it was a good idea, he was initially stumped as to why someone would embark on such a mission or how he could develop it into a viable television show. He came up with the story of the wrongfully accused brother, and began working on the plot outline and devising the characters. In 2003, he pitched the idea to the Fox Broadcasting Company but was turned down as Fox felt nervous about the long-term possibilities of such a series. He subsequently showed the concept to other channels but was also turned down as it was thought to be more suited for a film project than a television series. Prison Break was later considered as a possible 14-part miniseries, which drew the interest of Steven Spielberg before his departure due to his involvement with War of the Worlds. Thus, the miniseries never materialized. Following the huge popularity of serialized prime time television series such as Lost and 24, Fox backed the production in 2004. The pilot episode was filmed one year after Scheuring wrote the script.

Filming

The majority of the first season was filmed on location in and around Chicago. Joliet Prison closed in 2002, and in 2005 became the set of Prison Break as Fox River State Penitentiary. Scenes set in Lincoln's cell, the infirmary, and the prison yard were all shot on location there. Lincoln's cell was alleged to be where serial killer John Wayne Gacy was incarcerated, which at least one member of the production crew refused to enter, because it was allegedly haunted. Other sets were built at the prison, including the cell blocks that housed the general prison population; these blocks had three tiers of cells (instead of the real cell block's four), enlarged for the actors and cameras. Exterior scenes were filmed in areas around Chicago, Woodstock, and Joliet in Illinois. Other locations included O'Hare International Airport in Chicago and Toronto, Ontario in Canada. Prison Break production spent $2 million per episode in the state of Illinois, totaling $24 million in 2005.

Renewed for a second season, Prison Break resumed filming on June 15, 2006, in Dallas, Texas, due to the close proximity of rural and urban settings. Locations within a 30-minute radius of Dallas included Little Elm, Decatur, Mineral Wells, and McKinney. Many of these locations were used to represent various American towns. The show was expected to spend more than $50 million in Texas during the second season. For the final three episodes of the second season, filming took place in Pensacola, Florida to represent Panama. Each episode took eight days to film and contributed approximately $1.4 million to the local economy.

The third season was shot in Dallas and had a budget of $3 million per episode. Several of the exterior scenes with Lincoln and Gretchen negotiating the escape from the Panama jail were shot in the Casco Viejo quarter of Panama City. The principal photography for the fourth season was relocated to Los Angeles, California.

Music

The theme music of Prison Break and the incidental music of each episode was composed by Ramin Djawadi. The score for the first two seasons is featured in the Prison Break: Original Television Soundtrack, which was released on August 28, 2007. Djawadi and Ferry Corsten produced a remix of the theme music titled "Prison Break Theme (Ferry Corsten Breakout Mix)" as a single, which was released by Fox Music in 2006. In Europe, rapper Faf Larage's song "Pas le temps" is used by television network M6 in France and by RTL-TVI in Belgium to replace the show's original theme music in the title sequence, which generated publicity and helped to localize the show.

Format
Prison Break features a serialized story structure, similar to that of its first season companion show 24. At the 2009 TV Critics Press Tour, Kevin Reilly told reporters that the series would end with the fourth season. Despite decreasing ratings, Reilly attributed the cancellation to creativity. He stated, "The show has just played out. You get to a point creatively where you feel all the stories have been told, and you want to end strong and not gimp out in the end of the season." Regarding the finale, Reilly stated, "They have a really cool ending, actually. I know where they end, and it's a hell of an idea."

Tattoo
Designed by Tom Berg and created by Tinsley Transfers, Michael Scofield's tattoo took around five hours to be applied onto Wentworth Miller. In scenes where the actor is wearing a T-shirt and the entire tattoo is not being shown, only the forearm pieces of the tattoo were applied.

Reception

Ratings
The following seasonal rankings are based on a weighted average total viewers per episode as recorded by Nielsen Media Research. The recording period begins in late September (the start of the U.S. network television season) and ends in late May.

Critical response

The show debuted on August 29, 2005 to an estimated audience of 10.5 million viewers. Fox had not had such success for mid-year Monday numbers since Melrose Place and Ally McBeal aired in September 1998. The premiere was ranked first in both the 18–49 and 18–34 demographics. The strong debut performance was matched by positive reviews. The New York Times wrote, Prison Break was "more intriguing than most of the new network series, and it certainly is one of the most original", complimenting its ability to create a "suspenseful thriller" and its "authentic look". Gillian Flynn of Entertainment Weekly dubbed it one of the best new shows of 2005. The Washington Post criticized the "somber pretentiousness" and "uniformly overwrought" performances. Due to its ratings success, Fox extended Prison Break by an extra nine episodes, making it the first new series in the 2005–2006 television season to receive a full season order of 22 episodes. The series averaged 9.2 million viewers per week in its first season.

The premiere of the second season of Prison Break obtained an average of 9.4 million viewers. The decline was steeper among young-adult viewers with a decrease of 20% in the 18–49 demographic compared to its series premiere, but its household rating grew from 3.6% to 3.9% during the last half-hour. Robert Bianco of USA Today commented on the "harebrained absurdities that have swamped this show", and blamed the writers for being "incredibly lazy" for the continuous use of the tattoo as an "all-purpose plot fix". In contrast, Detroit Free Press commended the second-season premiere on matching the standard set by the first season, which delivered "rocking good entertainment" due to its "motley crew of cellblock characters" and the "taut, ingenious storytelling of series creator Paul T. Scheuring and his staff". The second season obtained its largest audience on the original airdate of the episode, "Chicago" with an average of 10.1 million viewers. Overall, the second season averaged 9.3 million viewers per week.

The third and particularly fourth season received progressively negative reviews, as the show's plot diverged from its origin story of breaking out of prison, and focused more on conventional elements of a government conspiracy drama series.

Season five received mixed reviews. On review aggregator Rotten Tomatoes, the season has an approval rating of 52% based on 21 reviews, with an average score of 6.61/10. The site's critical consensus reads, "Prison Break recaptures some of its old urgency in its return, but familiar faces and frenetic action aren't enough to make up for a plot that manages to bore while beggaring belief." On Metacritic, the season has a score of 48 out of 100, based on 18 critics, indicating "mixed or average reviews".

Classification
Concerns were raised by the Parents Television Council in the United States about the time slot in which Prison Break was broadcast (8:00 pm ET) because of graphic content. In France, the broadcasting watchdog, Conseil Supérieur de l'Audiovisuel (CSA), also complained that the violence in some episodes exceeded the amount allowed for its rating, which is "not for under 10s". Under France's regulations, any higher ratings would have moved the show away from its primetime timeslot to a later timeslot. However, the decision to change the rating would have affected only the first season, which had already been broadcast, and not the second season.

Awards and nominations

Following a successful airing of the series' first thirteen episodes, Prison Break was nominated for its first award, the 2005 People's Choice Award for Favorite New TV Drama. The series won the award in January 2006, beating other nominees in the same category, Commander in Chief and Criminal Minds. In January 2006, the show had two nominations at the 63rd Golden Globe Awards, which were Best Drama Television Series and Best Actor in a Drama Television Series for Wentworth Miller's performance. Lead actor Wentworth Miller, received another nomination for his performance in the first season at the 2005 Saturn Awards for Best Actor on Television. Likewise, the series was nominated for 2005 Saturn Award for Best Network Television Series. At the 2006 Television Critics Association Awards, the show was nominated for Best New Drama Series. Nominations for technical awards include the 2006 Eddie Award for Best Edited One-Hour Series for Commercial Television (Mark Helfrich for the pilot episode), and the 2006 Primetime Emmy award for Outstanding Main Title Theme Music (Ramin Djawadi). In December 2006, Robert Knepper was nominated for the 2006 Satellite Award for Best Actor in a Supporting Role in a Series, Mini-Series or Motion Picture Made for Television.

Alleged copyright infringement
On October 24, 2006, the Associated Press reported that Donald and Robert Hughes filed a lawsuit against Fox Broadcasting Company and the show's executive producer and creator, Paul Scheuring, for copyright infringement, seeking unspecified damages and other costs. They claimed that in 2001, they had sent Fox their manuscript which was based on their own experiences of a prison break at a juvenile facility. In the 1960s, Donald Hughes planned and successfully executed a prison escape for his brother, Robert Hughes, who was wrongfully incarcerated.

Distribution

Television
In Canada, Prison Break was broadcast on Global one hour before it aired on Fox, except in the Maritimes where it aired two hours before Fox's airing. Prison Break was the only new television series to be positioned in the top twenty television shows of 2005–2006 in Canada, achieving an average of 876,000 viewers in the key demographic of 18–49 and 1.4 million viewers nationally for its first season. Prison Break premiered on Australian television network Seven on February 1, 2006, to an average audience of 1.94 million. The first season attracted an overall average of 1.353 million viewers. After decreasing ratings throughout the second season, Seven decided to fast-track the airing of the third-season episodes. The fifth season revival moved to Network Ten and debuted on May 15, 2017.

In the United Kingdom, the first and second seasons premiered on Five, with the first season being replayed on UKTV Gold before the second season debuted on Five. Prior to the start of the third season, Sky One acquired the rights to broadcast Prison Break, paying £500,000 per episode. The series premiered in France on August 31, 2006, with an average of 5.5 million viewers. The second season premiered on September 13, 2007, to 5.3 million viewers. 

The first season's broadcast in Hong Kong on TVB Pearl received the largest audience in the country for a foreign drama. The series premiere obtained an average of 260,000 viewers while the first-season finale obtained an average of 470,000 viewers. The second season's premiere received an average of 270,000 viewers.

Home media

The DVD and Blu-ray Disc sets of each season were released after their television broadcast in various regions. At the 2006 International Consumer Electronics Show, 20th Century Fox Home Entertainment announced that the complete first season of Prison Break was to be released on Blu-ray in early 2007. The release date was later announced to be November 13, 2007, and Prison Break became the first television show to be released on Blu-ray Disc by Fox. The Blu-ray box set contains six discs and includes all the DVD box set's special features. A DVD set containing the first three seasons was released on May 19, 2008, in Region 2. The television movie, Prison Break: The Final Break, was included in the Season 4 set in Regions 2 and 4, but was released separately in Region 1. The Final Break was later released separately in Regions 2 and 4. In France, Germany and the United Kingdom, a Blu-ray package of all four seasons including The Final Break has been released. Over a year after its initial release, Season 4 was later re-issued in Region 4 without The Final Break included.

Online distribution
In addition to the television broadcast of the show, episodes of Prison Break have also been released on the Internet. Towards the end of the first season, episodes of Prison Break were made available for purchase online at the iTunes Store, which began on May 9, 2006. After the premiere of the second season of Prison Break, Fox began allowing online streaming of the current episode for free via more than 50 websites including AOL, Google, and Yahoo!, as well as its own extensive network. However, this was restricted to the United States. The first three episodes of the second season were broadcast commercial free, available for a week after their television broadcast date. Online streaming of episodes was postponed after the third episode. However, due to the show's three-week broadcast hiatus prompted by Fox's broadcast of the Major League Baseball playoff games in October, a strategy was developed by News Corporation (the parent company of Fox Broadcasting Company and MySpace) in an attempt to maintain their viewers' interest in the show. Starting in October, Fox began to stream past episodes of the second season on the social networking site MySpace and websites of the network's owned and operated stations (the stations are part of the Fox Television Stations Group). Although commercials were aired throughout the broadcast, the episodes were free of charge.

Other media

Spin-off series

A spin-off series, Prison Break: Proof of Innocence, was produced exclusively for mobile phones and was broadcast first to Sprint customers in April 2006 on SprintTV's Fox station. The first episode of Proof of Innocence became available on the Internet for viewing on May 8, 2006. This was an exclusive deal made between Toyota Motor and News Corporation's Fox network, allowing Toyota to sponsor exclusive content of the show and to obtain advertising exclusivity.

During the show's third season, a series of six online shorts, collectively known as Prison Break: Visitations, were made exclusively for Fox. They feature the characters Lechero, Sammy, McGrady, T-Bag, and Bellick. They were distributed on the Internet and are available for free from iTunes.

On October 24, 2007, The Hollywood Reporter reported that a full spin-off series was under development, tentatively titled Prison Break: Cherry Hill. The series was to revolve around an upper-middle-class housewife, Molly, and her stint in a women's prison. However, the producers' original idea to introduce Molly in the third season of Prison Break was later dropped due to the writers' strike. The new series was planned to instead begin under the Prison Break brand similar to CSI: Miami and CSI: NY, but ultimately did not go into production.

Connection to Breakout Kings
Robert Knepper reprised his role as T-Bag in the 2011 A&E Network television series, Breakout Kings, which was created by a few of Prison Break writers, Matt Olmstead and Nick Santora.

Magazine, novel, book and comic
In printed media, the show's tie-in products include an official magazine and a tie-in novel. The official magazine, published by Titan Publishing, was launched on November 21, 2006. Each issue contains interviews with selected cast and crew members with other feature stories.

The tie-in novel, Prison Break: The Classified FBI Files, contains details of the show's characters pertaining to the second season's storyline. Written by Paul Ruditis, the book is published by Simon & Schuster and was released on May 8, 2007.

In September 2009, Insight Editions published Prison Break: Behind the Scenes, a companion book featuring production photography, in which writers Christian Trokey and Kalinda Vazquez, as well as Paul Scheuring, Matt Olmstead, and director of photography Fernando Arguelles comment on the show's four-season run.

An official manga adaptation of the series became available on the online service Piccoma beginning June 23, 2019. Artwork is done by Hikosuke Soyama and the adaptation is under the supervision of Twentieth Century Fox.

Attraction tour
There is also a live feature called "Prison Break LIVE!", created by The Sudden Impact! Entertainment Company, which is an interactive experience aimed at bringing to life the atmosphere from the television series. The attraction toured the US, Australia, UK, China, Germany and Mexico from 2006 to 2008.

Video games
A mobile game for J2ME was released by Vivendi Games Mobile in 2008.

A video game based on Prison Break was in development for PlayStation 3 and Xbox 360 for release in February 2009, but was cancelled when Brash Entertainment shut down.

Development of Prison Break: The Conspiracy restarted when the game's developer, ZootFly, found a new publisher. The video game was released on March 30, 2010. The game's protagonist is Tom Paxton, a  employee who is sent inside of Fox River to observe and report every move of Michael Scofield. The game features voices from the original cast members with the exception of Sarah Wayne Callies (Dr. Sara Tancredi).

International adaptation
In April 2010, it was announced that the series would be adapted for Russia. On September 20, 2010, the Russian adaptation premiered on Channel One. This adaptation uses many of the features of the original series, with some scenes and dialogue copied completely, but also introduces new storylines and characters which reflect the Russian reality.

Notes

References

External links

 

 
2000s American crime drama television series
2010s American crime drama television series
2000s prison television series
2010s prison television series
2005 American television series debuts
2009 American television series endings
2017 American television series debuts
2017 American television series endings
American action television series
Crime thriller television series
English-language television shows
Fox Broadcasting Company original programming
American prison television series
Serial drama television series
Thriller television series
Television series by 20th Century Fox Television
American television series revived after cancellation
Television shows filmed in Los Angeles
Television shows filmed in Florida
Television shows set in Chicago
Television shows set in Los Angeles
Fiction about prison escapes